Val Rezzo is a comune (municipality) in the Province of Como in the Italian region Lombardy, located about  north of Milan and about  north of Como, on the border with Switzerland.

Val Rezzo borders the following municipalities: Bogno (Switzerland), Carlazzo, Cavargna, Certara (Switzerland), Cimadera (Switzerland), Corrido, Porlezza, San Nazzaro Val Cavargna, Valsolda.

Demographic evolution

References

Cities and towns in Lombardy